{{Infobox comics creator
| name_nonEN    = 赤坂 アカ
| image         =
| caption       =
| image_size    = 150
| alt           = 
| birth_name    = 
| birth_date    = 
| birth_place   = Sado, Niigata, Japan
| death_date    = 
| death_place   = 
| nationality   = 
| area          =  Manga artist
| cartoonist    = 
| write         = 
| art           = 
| pencil        = 
| ink           = 
| edit          = 
| publish       = 
| letter        = 
| color         = 
| signature     = 
| signature_alt = 
| notable works = Kaguya-sama: Love Is War, Oshi no Ko
| collaborators = 
| module        = 
| website       = 
| nonUS         = 
}}
 is a Japanese manga artist. His series Kaguya-sama: Love Is War was serialized in Shueisha's Miracle Jump between May 2015 and January 2016, and was then transferred to Weekly Young Jump starting from March 2016. It was the 9th best selling manga in Japan in 2019, with over 4 million copies sold. In 2020, he won the 65th Shogakukan Manga Award in the general category with the manga.

Starting from April 2020, his work Oshi no Ko, which is illustrated by Mengo Yokoyari, is serialized on Weekly Young Jump and is his second active series on the magazine at the same time. In August 2021, Oshi no Ko won the Next Manga Award in the print category.

In addition, he contributed to the background assets of the visual novel video game Subarashiki Hibi, released in Japan in 2010.

 Works 
  (2011-2012, story by Hikaru Sugii, character design by Ryō Ueda) 
  (2013-2015)
 Kaguya-sama: Love Is War'' (2015–2022)
  (2020–present, illustrated by Mengo Yokoyari)

See also 

 Subarashiki Hibi

References

External links 
  
  based on 

Living people
Manga artists from Niigata Prefecture
1988 births
Pseudonymous artists